Baiquan is a county of western Heilongjiang province, People's Republic of China. It is under the jurisdiction of the prefecture-level city of Qiqihar.

Administrative divisions 
There are seven towns and nine townships in the county:

Towns (镇) 
Baiquan
Sandao
Xingnong
Zhangchun
Longquan
Guofu
Fuqiang

Townships (乡) 
Xinsheng Township
Xingguo Township
Shangsheng Township
Xinghua Township
Dazhong Township
Fengchan Township
Yongqin Township
Shizhong Township
Ainong Township

Demographics 

Climate

Transport 
 China National Highway 202

Notes and references

External links
  Government site - 

Districts of Qiqihar